Zeaxanthin glucosyltransferase (crtX (gene)) is an enzyme with systematic name UDP-glucose:zeaxanthin beta-D-glucosyltransferase. This enzyme catalyses the following chemical reaction

 2 UDP-glucose + zeaxanthin  2 UDP + zeaxanthin bis(beta-D-glucoside)

The reaction proceeds in two steps with the monoglucoside as an intermediate.

References

External links 

EC 2.4.1